In statistics, the multinomial test is the test of the null hypothesis that the parameters of a multinomial distribution equal specified values; it is used for categorical data.

Beginning with a sample of  items each of which has been observed to fall into one of  categories. It is possible to define  as the observed numbers of items in each cell. Hence  

Next, defining a vector of parameters  where:

These are the parameter values under the null hypothesis.

The exact probability of the observed configuration  under the null hypothesis is given by

The significance probability for the test is the probability of occurrence of the data set observed, or of a data set less likely than that observed, if the null hypothesis is true.  Using an exact test, this is calculated as

where the sum ranges over all outcomes as likely as, or less likely than, that observed. For larger samples, asymptotic approximations are accurate enough and easier to calculate.

One of these approximations is the likelihood ratio. An alternative hypothesis can  be defined under which each value  is replaced by its maximum likelihood estimate  The exact probability of the observed configuration  under the alternative hypothesis is given by

(The factor  is chosen to make the statistic asymptotically chi-squared distributed, for convenient comparison to a familiar statistic commonly used for the same application.) 

If the null hypothesis is true, then as  increases, the distribution of  converges to that of chi-squared with  degrees of freedom. However it has long been known (e.g. The difference between the moments of chi-squared and those of the test statistic are a function of  Williams showed that the first moment can be matched as far as  if the test statistic is divided by a factor given by

Subsequently, Smith et al. derived a dividing factor which matches the first moment as far as  For the case of equal values of  this factor is 

The null hypothesis can also be tested by using Pearson's chi-squared test

where  is the expected number of cases in category  under the null hypothesis.

References 
 

Categorical variable interactions
Statistical tests
Nonparametric statistics